Strophanthus hispidus, the hispid strophanthus, (family: Apocynaceae) is a liana or shrub that can grow up to  tall. Its flowers feature a yellow corolla and yellow corona lobes spotted with red, purple or brown. The seeds, like those of several other Strophanthus species, contain potent cardiac glycosides (notably strophanthin) absorbable through wounds - hence its use in African arrow poisons and later in modern medicine as a digitalis-like heart stimulant. Strophanthus hispidus is native from west tropical Africa east to Tanzania and south to Angola. It is naturalized in China.

History of discovery
The plant was observed for the first time in Senegambia by a certain monsieur Houdelot, then in Sierra Leone between 1771 and 1775 by Henry Smeathman, likewise in Nigeria (in use among the Nupe) by William Balfour Baikie, in Gabon by Marie-Théophile Griffon du Bellay and in West Tropical Africa by Gustav Mann.

References

hispidus
Flora of West Tropical Africa
Flora of West-Central Tropical Africa
Flora of Tanzania
Flora of Angola
Plants described in 1802
Poisonous plants